Israel Sarug Ashkenazi (also "Saruk" or "Srugo") (16th century;  1590–1610) was a pupil of Isaac Luria, and devoted himself at the death of his master to the propagation of the latter's Kabbalistic system, for which he gained many adherents in various parts of Italy. Among these the most prominent were Menahem Azariah da Fano, whom he persuaded to spend large sums of money in the acquisition of Luria's manuscripts, and Aaron Berechiah of Modena, author of the Ma'abar Yabboḳ (Ma'abar Yabboḳ, Ḳorban Ta'anit, i.). Sarug lectured also in various places in Germany and in Amsterdam. In the latter city one of his disciples was Abraham de Herrera.

Sarug was the author of:
 A Kabbalistic essay entitled Ḳabbalah, published in the Maẓref la-Ḥokmah of Joseph Delmedigo (Basel, 1629)
 Hanhagot Yosher, or Tiḳḳun Ḳeri, or Ḳeri Miḳra (Salonica, 1752), hodegetics to asceticism
 Ḳonṭres Ne'im Zemirot Yisrael, a Kabbalistic commentary on three of Luria's piyyutim for Sabbath

References

 Its bibliography:
Steinschneider, Cat. Bodl. col. 1173;
Grätz, Gesch. x. 420;
Fuenn, Keneset Yisrael, p. 700.

External links
 Notes on the Study of Later Kabbalah in English: The Safed Period & Lurianic Kabbalah
  Which Lurianic Kabbalah?

Kabbalists
16th-century rabbis from the Ottoman Empire
Isaac Luria